Yashvardhan Kumar Sinha; born 4 October 1958 is an Indian diplomat who belongs to the Indian Foreign Service. He is the former High Commissioner of India to the United Kingdom. He was sworn in as Central Information Commissioner on January 1, 2019.

In October 2020, he has been selected to be the Chief Information Commissioner of India.

Personal life
Yashvardhan Kumar Sinha hails from Bihar. Born in a Kayastha family of Patna, he was schooled at Chesham and at the  St. Michael's High School, Patna. He holds a B.A. (Honours) degree in History from St. Stephen's College, Delhi and a Master of Arts degree in History from the University of Delhi. He also has an advanced diploma in Arabic from the American University in Cairo. He is married to Girija Sinha and they have two sons. He is the son of Lieutenant General Srinivas Kumar Sinha, PVSM, who was former Vice Chief of the Army Staff of the Indian Army, former Governor of Jammu and Kashmir and Assam, and former Ambassador of India to Nepal. His sisters are Manisha Sinha, Draper Chair in American History at the University of Connecticut, and Mrinalini Sinha, Alice Freeman Palmer Professor of History at the University of Michigan.

Career
Sinha is an Indian Foreign Service officer of the 1981 batch.
After retiring from foreign service, he was first appointed as Central Information Commissioner on 1 January 2019 and was subsequently sworn in as the Chief Information Commissioner of India on 7 November 2020.

References 

1958 births
People from Patna
Indian diplomats
Indian Foreign Service officers
Living people